The 2016 GEICO 500 was a NASCAR Sprint Cup Series race scheduled that was held on May 1, 2016, at Talladega Superspeedway in Lincoln, Alabama. Contested over 188 laps on the 2.66 mile (4.28 km) superspeedway, it was the 10th race of the 2016 NASCAR Sprint Cup Series season. Brad Keselowski won the race. Kyle Busch finished second. Austin Dillon, Jamie McMurray and Chase Elliott rounded out the top-five, The race had 37 lead changes among different drivers and ten cautions for 41 laps.

Report

Background

Talladega Superspeedway, formerly known as Alabama International Motor Speedway, is a motorsports complex located north of Talladega, Alabama. It is located on the former Anniston Air Force Base in the small city of Lincoln. A tri-oval, the track was constructed in 1969 by the International Speedway Corporation, a business controlled by the France family. Talladega is most known for its steep banking. The track currently hosts NASCAR's Sprint Cup Series, Xfinity Series and Camping World Truck Series. Talladega is the longest NASCAR oval with a length of 2.66-mile-long (4.28 km) tri-oval like the Daytona International Speedway, which is a 2.5-mile-long (4.0 km).

Entry list
The entry list for the GEICO 500 was released on Monday, April 25 at 10:42 a.m. Eastern time. Forty-one cars are entered for the race.

Practice

First practice

Final practice

Qualifying

He said afterwards that like he "said in Daytona, this is all team guys. This had nothing to do with me and they have brought a fast car back. This is our same car that we ran at Daytona. Unfortunately I didn’t bring it home in one piece (at Daytona), they had to fix it, but they did a great job doing that and hopefully we can just try to be smart, try to cut down on some of the dumb mistakes I made in February and try to give ourselves a shot and be there at the end.”

Austin Dillon, who qualified second, talked about how the No. 24 team "has won all the poles the last two years at speedways it seems like. To be that close to him and we know we can get a little better here and there, but that is just the big pick up. I think we qualified 24th here the last race. Huge pick up for us and we are excited for the race.”

Dale Earnhardt Jr., who qualified third, said he "picked up a little bit. I was just talking with Kasey (Kahne) about our lines and what we did different. We think we saw a little bit out there that makes a difference. We were able to pick up a little bit. It’s hard to move forward in the second round at speedways. Usually what you’ve got in the first round is what you’ve got in the second round, but we jumped a couple of guys and got a better starting spot.”

Qualifying results

Race

First half

Start
Under overcast Alabama skies, Chase Elliott led the field to the green flag at 1:04 p.m. By the end of the first lap, most of the field was racing three-wide. Matt Kenseth used the bottom line coming to the line to take the lead on lap 15. By lap 24, he settled on the bottom with teammate Denny Hamlin in tow. Elliott used the middle line to pass Kenseth on the backstretch and retake the lead on lap 29. A number of cars began pitting on lap 36. Elliott hit pit road on lap 38 and handed the lead to Michael Waltrip. He pitted the next lap and the lead cycled back Kyle Busch. Brian Scott and Landon Cassill were tagged for their crews being over the wall too soon and Trevor Bayne and Casey Mears were tagged for speeding and all were forced to serve pass-through penalties.

Second quarter
The first caution of the race flew on lap 49 for a three-car wreck on the backstretch. Exiting turn 2, Dale Earnhardt Jr. got loose, turned up the track and slammed the wall. This also collected Kasey Kahne and Matt DiBenedetto. Earnhardt said afterwards that the car's "splitter was on the ground real bad the whole first run and we took some rounds out of the back and that really made the car too loose off the corner. Same thing we did at Daytona. We’ve just go to look at our adjustments a little bit different.” Waltrip opted not to pit and assumed the lead. Under the caution, Tony Stewart pulled onto pit road to get out and allow Ty Dillon to take over. Stewart said afterwards that the whole situation "sucks, to be honest. I know why we got to do it, but it sucks. It still sucks that you have to do it, but if I hadn’t broke my back at the end of January, we wouldn’t be in this situation. Good news is this is the last time we have to do it, and I am back in next week.”

The race restarted on lap 58. Kenseth used the outside line to retake the lead the next lap. The second caution of the race flew the same lap for a three-car wreck in turn 3. Going down the backstretch, Waltrip was shoved onto the apron. He came back up and side-swiped Mears. Aric Almirola was also caught in the wreck.

The race restarted on lap 63. Brad Keselowski used the outside line to take the lead on lap 73. From lap 83 to lap 90, Keselowski and Hamlin swapped the lead back and forth multiple times. Eventually, Keselowski jumped ahead and started blocking the advances of the three lines of cars. As the field closed in on the halfway point of the race, rain began being reported. The third caution of the race flew on lap 97 for a multi-car wreck on the backstretch. During that wreck, Chris Buescher flipped multiple times, causing the car to land back on all fours. Michael Annett, Jimmie Johnson, Carl Edwards, and Austin Dillon were also involved. Buescher said afterwards that the wreck "was so quick I never had any time to react. We got clipped in the right rear and as soon as it turned it went up on its lid. I thought we were clear of the wreck. I saw it happening in front of us and checked up and the next thing I knew I was upside down. I am pretty sick and tired of speedway racing at this point. It has been a rough year for that. We felt we were decent this race. We were holding our own and waiting but here we are. It is unfortunate. I really hate it for the guys.”

Second half

Halfway
The race restarted on lap 103. Kevin Harvick took over the lead on lap 101. Elliott took the lead on lap 104. Harvick took back the lead on lap 108. Trevor Bayne took the race lead on lap 110. The fourth caution of the race flew with 79 laps to go for a multi-car wreck in turn 1, involving Earnhardt Jr. and Carl Edwards after he suffered a right-front tire blowout and slammed the wall collecting Earnhardt. Edwards said afterwards that something on his car "just let go there and you hate to collect anybody, so definitely sorry to the 88 guys for getting their car involved in that. We had something torn up there, drove down into turn one, and I just felt the right front fall down and that was it. You’re kind of just along for the ride.” Earnhardt would go on to finish 40th.

The race restarted with 73 laps to go. Harvick beat Bayne to the line to take the lead with 72 laps to go. Bayne worked his way back to the lead on the bottom with 70 laps to go. Harvick retook it with 69 to go. Bayne took back the lead with 65 laps to go. The fifth caution of the race flew with 62 laps to go for a single-car spin in turn 4 involving Kahne.

The race restarted with 55 laps to go. Kyle Larson used the middle line to take the lead with 51 laps to go. Bayne retook it with 49 laps to go. Larson pulled ahead of Bayne the next lap. Kenseth pulled ahead to the lead with 43 laps to go. The sixth caution of the race flew with 35 laps to go after David Ragan blew an engine in turn 2.

Fourth quarter

The race restarted with 33 laps to go. Bayne retook the lead with 32 laps to go. Keselowski retook the lead with 31 laps to go. The seventh caution of the race flew with 26 laps to go for a multi-car wreck in turn 1 that collected 21 cars.

The race restarted with 22 laps to go. Logano took the lead with 20 to go. Debris in turn 2 brought out the eighth caution of the race with 19 laps to go.

The race restarted with 17 laps to go. Keselowski retook the lead with 16 laps to go. The ninth caution of the race flew with six laps to go for a multi-car wreck on the backstretch that collected 12 cars. Danica Patrick, who slammed the wall head-on at a high speed, said she "would say that's probably the most scared (I've been), trying to hop out of a car with the fire on the inside. I haven't had fire on the inside before. I've seen it on the outside. Honestly, I was thinking about my hair. I've got a lot of hair and I don't want to lose it. I've had a couple of practice rounds now of getting out of the car as quickly as possible, but that was the worst one so far. At Daytona a couple of years ago on the front straight without a SAFER barrier was probably one of the hardest impacts, but this one was probably worse." Kenseth, whose car blew over and slid down the backstretch, said that Logano "ran me off the race track and that got me way behind so I thought we were done with that, but maybe we aren't. So he ran me off the track and honestly I was just going straight here and just got ran into and then I was just hanging on."

The race restarted with four laps to go and Keselowski scored the victory as the field wrecked behind him in the tri-oval.

Race results

Race summary
 Lead changes: 37 among different drivers
 Cautions/Laps: 10 for 41
 Red flags: 0    
 Time of race: 3 hours, 34 minutes and 15 seconds
 Average speed:

Media

Television
Fox Sports covered their 16th race at the Talladega Superspeedway. Mike Joy, six-time Talladega winner – and all-time restrictor plate race winner – Jeff Gordon and four-time Talladega winner Darrell Waltrip had the call in the booth for the race. Jamie Little, Chris Neville, Vince Welch and Matt Yocum handled the action on pit road for the television side.

Radio
MRN had the radio call for the race which was also simulcast on Sirius XM NASCAR Radio. Joe Moore, Jeff Striegle and Rusty Wallace called the race in the booth when the field raced through the tri-oval. Dave Moody called the race from the Sunoco spotters stand outside turn 2 when the field raced through turns 1 and 2. Mike Bagley called the race from a platform inside the backstretch when the field raced down the backstretch. Kyle Rickey called the race from the Sunoco spotters stand outside turn 4 when the field raced through turns 3 and 4. Alex Hayden, Winston Kelley and Steve Post worked pit road for the radio side.

Standings after the race

Drivers' Championship standings

Manufacturers' Championship standings

Note: Only the first 16 positions are included for the driver standings.. – Driver has clinched a Chase position.

Note

Only 5 cars out of the 40 that started the race finished with no damage on their cars.

References

GEICO 500
GEICO 500
NASCAR races at Talladega Superspeedway
GEICO 500